The 2022–23 season is the 33rd in the history of İstanbul Başakşehir F.K. and their ninth consecutive season in the top flight. The club are participating in the Süper Lig, Turkish Cup, and UEFA Europa Conference League.

Players

First-team squad

Out on loan

Pre-season and friendlies

Competitions

Overall record

Süper Lig

League table

Results summary

Results by round

Matches 
The league schedule was released on 4 July.

Turkish Cup

UEFA Europa Conference League

Second qualifying round 
The draw for the second qualifying round was held on 15 June 2022.

Third qualifying round 
The draw for the third qualifying round was held on 18 July 2022.

Play-off round 
The draw for the play-off round was held on 2 August 2022.

Group stage 

The draw for the group stage was held on 26 August 2022.

Round of 16

References 

İstanbul Başakşehir F.K. seasons
Istanbul Basaksehir
Istanbul Basaksehir